Rasteh Kenar-e Buin (also Romanized as Rāsteh Kenār-e Bū’īn; also known as Rāsteh Kenār) is a village in Gurab Pas Rural District, in the Central District of Fuman County, Gilan Province, Iran. At the 2006 census, its population was 514, in 140 families.

References 

Populated places in Fuman County